Josip Alebić (also known as Jozo or Joško; 7 January 1947 – 8 March 2021) was a Croatian sprinter who specialised in 400 metres. He competed for Yugoslavia in the 400 m and 4 × 400 m relay events in the 1972, 1976 and 1980 Summer Olympics.

He was also won the Athletics Championship of Yugoslavia in 400 m race eight times between 1972 and 1981.

International competitions

References

External links

1947 births
2021 deaths
Croatian male sprinters
Olympic athletes of Yugoslavia
Athletes (track and field) at the 1972 Summer Olympics
Athletes (track and field) at the 1976 Summer Olympics
Athletes (track and field) at the 1980 Summer Olympics
Yugoslav male sprinters
Mediterranean Games gold medalists for Yugoslavia
Mediterranean Games bronze medalists for Yugoslavia
Athletes (track and field) at the 1975 Mediterranean Games
Athletes (track and field) at the 1979 Mediterranean Games
Mediterranean Games medalists in athletics